The 10th Army Corps was an Army corps in the Imperial Russian Army.

Composition
The 10th Army Corps was composed of the 9th Infantry Division, 31st Infantry Division and the 10th Cavalry Division.

Part of
3rd Army: 1914-1916
4th Army: 1916
2nd Army: 1916-1917
10th Army: 1917
9th Army: 1917

Commanders
1876-1878: Semyon Vorontsov
1878-1879: Vasily Fedorovich Rall
1889-1890: Victor Deziderjevitch Dandevill
1890-1901: Victor Fedorovitch Winberg
1901-1904: Kapiton Konstantinovitch Slutchevsky
1904-1905: Konstantin Tserpitsky
1906-1907: Pavel Alexandrovich Layming
1907-1911: Yakov Zhilinsky
1911-1914: Thadeus von Sivers
1914-1916: Nikolai Protopopov
1916-1917: Nikolai Danilov
1917: Januariusz Cichowicz

References

Corps of the Russian Empire
Military units and formations established in 1876
Military units and formations disestablished in 1918
1876 establishments in the Russian Empire